Barbara may refer to:

People
 Barbara (given name)
 Barbara (painter) (1915–2002), pseudonym of Olga Biglieri, Italian futurist painter
 Barbara (singer) (1930–1997), French singer
 Barbara Popović (born 2000), also known mononymously as Barbara, Macedonian singer
 Bárbara (footballer) (born 1988), Brazilian footballer

Film and television
 Barbara (1961 film), a West German film
 Bárbara (film), a 1980 Argentine film
 Barbara (1997 film), a Danish film directed by Nils Malmros, based on Jacobsen's novel
 Barbara (2012 film), a German film
 Barbara (2017 film), a French film
 Barbara (TV series), a British sitcom

Places
 Barbara (Paris Métro), a metro station in Montrouge and Bagneux, France
 Barbaria (region), or al-Barbara, an ancient region in Northeast Africa
 Barbara, Arkansas, U.S.
 Barbara, Gaza, a former Palestinian village near Gaza
 Barbara, Marche, a town in Italy
 Berbara, or al-Barbara, Lebanon
 Berbara, Akkar District, a village in Lebanon
 Berbera, Somaliland

Print
 Bárbara (comics), an Argentine comic book series
 Barbara, a 1939 novel by Danish-writing Faroese author Jørgen-Frantz Jacobsen
 Major Barbara (play), a 1905 play by George Bernard Shaw

Music
 Barbara (We Are Scientists album), 2010
 Barbara (Trixie Mattel album), 2020
 Barbara, a 1996 album by Barbara
 "Barbara" (The Beach Boys song), a song by Dennis Wilson of The Beach Boys
 "Barbarasong" ("Barbara Song"), from Weill's The Threepenny Opera
 "Barbara", a 1927 song written by Abner Silver
 "Barbara", a 1977 song by Chris Roberts
 "Barbara", a 1968 song by George Morgan
 "Barbara", a 1960 song by The Temptations
 "Barbara", a song by Martin Mann
 "Barbara", a 1979 song by Enzo Carella

Ships
 , one of several merchant ships by that name
 , more than one ship of the British Royal Navy
 , a United States Navy patrol boat

Other
 Barbara (moth), a genus of moths
 234 Barbara, an asteroid
 Barbara, a mnemonic devised by mediaeval scholasticism for a particular syllogism

See also
 Santa Barbara (disambiguation)
 Barbarella (disambiguation)
 Barbary Coast (disambiguation)
 Barbera (disambiguation)
 Barabara, a traditional dwelling of the Aleutian Islands